Asian Highway 60 (AH60) is an international route running  from Omsk, Omsk Oblast, in Russia to Burubaytal, Jambyl Region, in Kazakhstan.

Route
Omsk - Cherlak - (Russia–Kazakhstan border) – Pnirtyshskoe – Pavlodar – Semipalatinsk – Georgievka – Taskesken –
Ucharal – Almaty – Kaskelen – Burubaytal

Associated routes

Russia 
: Omsk – Cherlak – border with Kazakhstan . This section of route AH60 runs concurrently with European route E127.

Kazakhstan
: Pnirtyshskoe - Georgievka :.
: Georgievka - Almaty : 
:

Junctions
Russia
  Omsk
Kazakhstan
  Pavlodar
  Taskesken
  Ucharal
  Almaty
  Burubaital

See also
 Asian Highway 6
 Asian Highway 7
 List of Asian Highways

References

External links
  Treaty on Asian Highways with routes

Asian Highway Network
Roads in Russia
Roads in Kazakhstan